10 Leonis Minoris is a single variable star in the northern constellation Leo Minor, located approximately 191 light years away based on parallax. It has the variable star designation SU Leonis Minoris; 10 Leonis Minoris is the Flamsteed designation. This body is visible to the naked eye as a faint, orange-hued star with a baseline apparent visual magnitude of 4.54. It is moving closer to the Earth with a heliocentric radial velocity of −12 km/s.

This is an evolved giant star with a stellar classification of G8.5 III.
It is reported as a RS CVn variable with magnitude varying by 0.02 mag. and showing a high level of chromospheric activity. The star has 2.54 times the mass of the Sun and has expanded to 9.20 times the Sun's radius. It is radiating 51.4 times the luminosity of the Sun from its enlarged photosphere at an effective temperature of 5,099 K.

References

G-type giants
RS Canum Venaticorum variables
Leo Minor
BD+37 2004
Leonis Minoris, 10
082635
Leonis Minoris, SU
046952
3800